The enzyme ornithine decarboxylase (ODC) catalyzes the decarboxylation of ornithine (a product of the urea cycle) to form putrescine. This reaction is the committed step in polyamine synthesis. In humans, this protein has 461 amino acids and forms a homodimer.

Reaction mechanism 

Lysine 69 on ornithine decarboxylase (ODC) binds the cofactor pyridoxal phosphate to form a Schiff base. Ornithine displaces the lysine to form a Schiff base attached to orthonine, which decarboxylates to form a quinoid intermediate. This intermediate rearranges to form a Schiff base attached to putrescine, which is attacked by lysine to release putrescine product and reform PLP-bound ODC.

This is the first step and the rate-limiting step in humans for the production of polyamines, compounds required for cell division.

Structure

The active form of ornithine decarboxylase is a homodimer. Each monomer contains a barrel domain, consisting of an alpha-beta barrel, and a sheet domain, composed of two beta-sheets. The domains are connected by loops. The monomers connect to each other via interactions between the barrel of one monomer and the sheet of the other. Binding between monomers is relatively weak, and ODC interconverts rapidly between monomeric and dimeric forms in the cell.

The pyridoxal phosphate cofactor binds lysine 69 at the C-terminus end of the barrel domain.  The active site is at the interface of the two domains, in a cavity formed by loops from both monomers.

Function

The ornithine decarboxylation reaction catalyzed by ornithine decarboxylase is the first and committed step in the synthesis of polyamines, particularly putrescine, spermidine and spermine.  Polyamines are important for stabilizing DNA structure, the DNA double strand-break repair pathway and as antioxidants. Therefore, ornithine decarboxylase is an essential enzyme for cell growth, producing the polyamines necessary to stabilize newly synthesized DNA. Lack of ODC causes cell apoptosis in embryonic mice, induced by DNA damage.

Proteasomal degradation

ODC is the most well-characterized cellular protein subject to ubiquitin-independent proteasomal degradation. Although most proteins must first be tagged with multiple ubiquitin molecules before they are bound and degraded by the proteasome, ODC degradation is instead mediated by several recognition sites on the protein and its accessory factor antizyme. The ODC degradation process is regulated in a negative feedback loop by its reaction products.

Until a report by Sheaff et al. (2000), which demonstrated that the cyclin-dependent kinase (Cdk) inhibitor p21Cip1 is also degraded by the proteasome in a ubiquitin-independent manner, ODC was the only clear example of ubiquitin-independent proteasomal degradation.

Clinical significance 

ODC is a transcriptional target of the oncogene Myc and is upregulated in a wide variety of cancers. The polyamine products of the pathway initialized by ODC are associated with increased cell growth and reduced apoptosis. Ultraviolet light, asbestos and androgens released by the prostate gland are all known to induce increased ODC activity associated with cancer. Inhibitors of ODC such as eflornithine have been shown to effectively reduce cancers in animal models, and drugs targeting ODC are being tested for potential clinical use.
The mechanism by which ODC promotes carcinogenesis is complex and not entirely known. Along with their direct effect on DNA stability, polyamines also upregulate gap junction genes and downregulate tight junction genes. Gap junction genes are involved in communication between carcinogenic cells and tight junction genes act as tumor suppressors.

ODC gene expression is induced by a large number of biological stimuli including seizure activity in the brain. Inactivation of ODC by difluoromethylornithine (eflornithine) is used to treat cancer and facial hair growth in postmenopausal females.

ODC is also an enzyme indispensable to parasites like Trypanosoma, Giardia, and Plasmodium, a fact exploited by the drug eflornithine.

References

External links 
 Ornithine decarboxylase at herkules.oulu.fi
 

EC 4.1.1